Events from the year 1834 in Ireland.

Events
 17 December – the Dublin and Kingstown Railway, the first public railway in Ireland, opens between Westland Row, Dublin, and Kingstown.
 18 December – Tithe War: "Rathcormac massacre": At Gortroe, near Rathcormac, County Cork, armed Constabulary reinforced by the regular British Army kill at least nine and wound thirty protesters.
 National Education Act provides for a national system of primary education, including Catholic children, taught in the English language.
 St. Vincent's Hospital is set up at St Stephen's Green, Dublin, by Mary Aikenhead, staffed by the Religious Sisters of Charity.
 Downshire Bridge ("The Cut") underpass is built in Banbridge, County Down, by contractor William Dargan.

Sport

Croquet
Croquet is recorded as being played in Ireland (at Greenmount near Castlebellingham, County Louth) at about this date.

Births
March – Timothy Eaton, businessman in Canada, founder of Eaton's department store (died 1907).
15 July – John Horgan, politician and member of the Western Australian Legislative Council (died 1907).
1 August – William Murphy, evangelical Protestant preacher (died 1872).
4 September – Robert Montresor Rogers, recipient of the Victoria Cross for gallantry in 1860 at the Taku Forts, China (died 1895).
24 December – Charles W. Jones, lawyer and United States Senator in Florida (died 1897).
Percy Hetherington Fitzgerald, literary biographer, drama critic and sculptor (died 1925).

Deaths
6 January – Richard Martin, "Humanity Dick", politician and animal rights activist (born 1754).
4 June – Samuel Greg, entrepreneur and pioneer of the factory system at Quarry Bank Mill (born 1758).

References

 
Years of the 19th century in Ireland
1830s in Ireland
Ireland
Ireland